Jang Min-hee (Hangul: 장민희, born 5 April 1999) is a South Korean archer. She won gold in the women's individual and team events at the 2021 World Archery Championships held in Yankton, United States. She also won the gold medal in the women's team event at the 2020 Summer Olympics held in Tokyo, Japan.

Career

She competed at the 2019 World Archery Youth Championships in Madrid, Spain. She won two gold medals from women's team and mixed team event, bronze medal in individual competition. She made her Olympic debut at 2020 Summer Olympics. With her teammates Kang Chae-young and An San, they won gold medal in women's team event. Two months later, she also won the gold medal in the women's individual and women's team events at the 2021 World Archery Championships held in Yankton, United States.

References

External links
 

1999 births
Living people
South Korean female archers
Olympic archers of South Korea
Archers at the 2020 Summer Olympics
Place of birth missing (living people)
Olympic medalists in archery
Medalists at the 2020 Summer Olympics
Olympic gold medalists for South Korea
World Archery Championships medalists
21st-century South Korean women